Ora Rush Weed (October 6, 1868 – May 4, 1942) was a  Methodist minister who founded Weedville, a small farming community in Arizona. Weedville's utilities are provided by the City of Peoria. The area is unincorporated which means that the land is not governed by Peoria, the local municipal corporation, instead it is administered by the county.

Early years
Ora Rush Weed was born in Hardin, Ray County in Missouri. He was married to Phoebe Pomeroy Weed with whom he had 7 children. Weed became an ordinated Methodist minister. Soon, he moved with his family moved to Anderson County, Kansas. He was stern as a minister and believed that Methodism was too soft in the teachings of Christianity. Therefore, he moved to Gridley, Coffery, Kansas and finally to the Territory of Arizona in 1911.

Weedville, Arizona

In Arizona, together with his family and some followers, he homesteaded the area which is located within 71st. and 75th Aves. between Thunderbird Blvd. and Acoma Drive. Rev. Weed established the Old Path Church, cemetery (1921) and boarding school, and a small religious community developed around these structures. Rev. Weed named his church and cemetery "Old Path" after a passage from the bible in the book if Jeremiah which states the following:

Rev. Weed named the small religious community"Weedville" after himself. Weedville sustained itself with farming, sales from a small country store which he ran, and by making and selling brooms made from broomcorn which Rev. Weed established. The brooms were made by former prison inmates. Weed donated land and buildings to the Southwest Indian School.

Death

Weed died May 4, 1942 in Glendale, Arizona and was buried in the Old Paths Cemetery. He was survived by his wife and six of his seven children. The 160 acres was sold off, with the majority of the land going to the Southwest Indian School and other religious organizations. The private cemetery still exists today and is maintained by Weed's descendants. The original Old Path Church bell hangs on a post located in the grounds of the cemetery. The Southwest Indian School has become the Southwest Indian Ministry Center. Much of Weedville remains an unincorporated county island.

Historic structures of Weedville

In pop culture
Arizona Republic writer Jim Cook had a chapter on Weedville in his 2002 book, "Arizona Liars Journal", published by Cowboy Miner Productions; .

Further reading
 Gilbert, Kathleen  (2004) More Than A Century of Peoria People, Progress, and Pride (Heritage Publishers)

See also

 Weedville, Arizona
 List of historic properties in Peoria, Arizona

Arizona pioneers
 Mansel Carter
 Bill Downing
 Henry Garfias
 Winston C. Hackett
 John C. Lincoln
 Paul W. Litchfield
 Joe Mayer
 William John Murphy
 Wing F. Ong
 Levi Ruggles
 Sedona Schnebly
 Michael Sullivan 
 Trinidad Swilling
 Henry Wickenburg

References

1868 births
1942 deaths
American city founders
Arizona pioneers
People from Ray County, Missouri
People of the American Old West